The Ryazan State University named for S. A. Yesenin is a university in Ryazan, Ryazan Oblast, Russia. It was founded in 1915. It bears the name of  Russian poet Sergei Yesenin, who grew up in the region.

History
RSU was founded in 1915, as a women's teacher training institute. In 1918, it was renamed as the Ryazan State Pedagogical Institute. In 1930 it was restructured and again renamed as the Ryazan State Pedagogical University. It began to expand its course offerings beyond teacher training in the 1980s; in 1992, it was one of the first pedagogical universities to be granted full university status. , they enrolled roughly 5,500 students and employed 400 faculty and administrative staff.

The university began to use its present name in 2006.

References

Notes

Sources

External links
Official site

Ryazan
Universities in Russia
Educational institutions established in 1915
Buildings and structures in Ryazan Oblast
1915 establishments in the Russian Empire
Objects of cultural heritage of Russia of regional significance
Cultural heritage monuments in Ryazan Oblast